General José María Bruguez is a district in the department of Presidente Hayes, Paraguay.

References 
 

Populated places in the Presidente Hayes Department